The following lists events that happened during 1963 in the Grand Duchy of Luxembourg.

Incumbents

Events

January – March
 23 March – Representing Luxembourg, Nana Mouskouri finishes eighth in the Eurovision Song Contest 1963 with the song À force de prier.

April – June
 29 April – Grand Duchess Charlotte pays a state visit to the United States until 4 May.

July – September
 9 October – Jeunesse Esch beat FC Haka 4–0 to become the only Luxembourgian side to progress to the last sixteen of the European Cup.
 30 October – The national football team shocks the  Netherlands by winning 2–1 in the second qualifying round for the 1964 European Nations' Cup, progressing 3–2 on aggregate.

October – December
 4 November – Vice President Lyndon B. Johnson visits Luxembourg.
 18 December – Luxembourg is knocked out at the final stage of qualifying for the 1964 European Nations' Cup, losing a play-off against Denmark 1–0, having drawn 5–5 with the Danes on aggregate.

Births
 12 March – Marc Angel, politician
 10 April – Marc Spautz, trade unionist and politician
 1 May – Prince Guillaume of Luxembourg
 4 July – Ni Xia Lian, table tennis player
 18 July – Marc Girardelli, skier
 16 September – Luc Frieden, politician

Deaths
 29 March - Michel Stoffel, painter
 26 August – Pierre Clemens, cyclist

Footnotes

References